Sverdlovsky (masculine), Sverdlovskaya (feminine), or Sverdlovskoye (neuter) is the name of several inhabited localities in Russia.

Urban localities
Sverdlovsky, Moscow Oblast, a work settlement in Shchyolkovsky District of Moscow Oblast

Rural localities
Sverdlovsky, Kemerovo Oblast, a settlement in Podgornovskaya Rural Territory of Leninsk-Kuznetsky District of Kemerovo Oblast
Sverdlovsky, Kursk Oblast, a settlement in Kommunarovsky Selsoviet of Belovsky District of Kursk Oblast
Sverdlovsky, Orenburg Oblast, a settlement in Sverdlovsky Selsoviet of Krasnogvardeysky District of Orenburg Oblast
Sverdlovskoye, a selo in Sverdlovsky Selsoviet of Khabarsky District of Altai Krai
Sverdlovskaya, Tyumen Oblast, a village in Sladkovsky District of Tyumen Oblast
Sverdlovskaya, Vologda Oblast, a village in Verkhovsky Selsoviet of Tarnogsky District of Vologda Oblast